Archaeoses is a genus of moths belonging to the family Cossidae.

Species
Archaeoses magicosema (Meyrick, 1936)
Archaeoses pentasema (Lower, 1915)
Archaeoses polygrapha (Lower, 1893)

References

Cossidae genera